Automeris zugana is a moth of the family Saturniidae first described by Herbert Druce in 1886. It is found from Panama to western Ecuador. The habitat consists of hyperhumid tropical rain forests at altitudes between 60 and 1,400 meters.

The larvae feed on Quercus and Salix species.

References

Moths described in 1886
Hemileucinae
Moths of Central America
Moths of South America